CAT1 or Cat 1 may refer to:

 Category 1 cable, unshielded twisted pair type cable
 Atwood/Coghlin Airport (ICAO airport code)
 
 Cat #1 (album), an album by Peter Criss
  LTE User Equipment Category 1